Central State Hospital, formally referred to as the Central Indiana Hospital for the Insane, was a psychiatric treatment hospital in Indianapolis, Indiana. The hospital was established in 1848 to treat patients from anywhere in the state, but by 1905, with the establishment of psychiatric hospitals in other parts of Indiana, Central State served only the counties in the middle of the state. In 1950, it had 2,500 patients. Allegations of abuse, funding shortfalls, and the move to less institutional methods of treatment led to its closure in 1994. Since then efforts have been made to redevelop the site for various uses.

History

The Indiana legislature authorized the establishment of a "hospital for the insane" as early as 1827, but actual construction of a facility was delayed for several years. The Indiana Hospital for the Insane finally opened in November 1848 with a total of five patients. In 1889, the hospital was renamed the Central Indiana Hospital for the Insane. After 1926 it was known as Central State Hospital, and by 1928, physicians cared for nearly 3,000 patients.

From 1848 to 1948, the hospital grew yearly until it encompassed two massive ornate buildings (one for male and one for female patients); a pathological department; a "sick" hospital for the treatment of physical ailments; a farm colony where patients engaged in "occupational therapy"; a chapel; an amusement hall complete with an auditorium, billiards, and bowling alleys; a bakery; a fire house; a cannery manned by patients; and idyllic gardens and fountains.

The more ornate of the two massive buildings came to be known as "the Seven Steeples". This building, which housed female patients, was designed using the Kirkbride Plan for mental healthcare facilities.

For a half-century, this complex buildings and gardens housed mentally ill patients from all regions of Indiana. By 1905, however, the state had built mental health institutions in Evansville, Logansport, Madison, and Richmond, thereby relieving an overcrowded Central State Hospital of some of its patient load and leaving it to treat only those from the "central district", an area of 38 counties situated in the middle portion of the state. In 1950 patient population reached 2,500

By the early 1970s, most of the hospital's ostentatious Victorian-era buildings had been declared unsound and razed. The Men's Department Building (also a Kirkbride Plan structure) had been demolished already in 1941. In their place, the state constructed brick buildings of a nondescript, institutional genre. These modern buildings and the medical staff therein continued to serve the state's mentally ill until allegations of patient abuse and funding troubles sparked an effort to forge new alternatives to institutionalization which, in turn, led to the hospital's closure in 1994.

Current status

The grounds of Central State Hospital were still largely vacant as of 2011. In place of the demolished Women's Ward (Seven Steeples) is a large lawn. There are approximately ten buildings on the grounds that were associated with the hospital. The Pathology Department building, built in 1895, is well preserved and houses the Indiana Medical History Museum. The three more modern wards (Evans, Bolton, and Bahr) were built in 1974 when the others were demolished. The oldest building on the property is the old power house, built in 1886. The Administration building, which was built in 1938, is now the structure most commonly associated with the hospital, although it never housed patients. In 2005, the Beckmann Theatre was granted temporary occupancy of the 1895 Laundry Building for staging its production of Asylum. More recently, the building was used for storing cars.

The Indiana State Archives, the Indiana State Library, and the Indiana Medical History Museum are preserving the history of an institution that served the mentally ill of Indiana for 146 years.

In March 2003, the city of Indianapolis purchased the property from the state for $400,000. The land that was acquired consists of  located on the city's westside at the 2800-3300 blocks of West Washington Street.

In December 2006, the city approved the sale the Central State Hospital site to a developer for just over $2 million. The developer began further negotiations with the city to determine the future uses, including apartments, shops, and green space. About six months later the developers sought to buy another  from the city, at a cost of $223,500.

In late 2013, several buildings, including the former Administrative Building as well as the prominent Powerhouse, were purchased by a company known for refurbishing buildings otherwise left to waste. The project to turn the administrative building into student apartments began in January 2014, with some students moving in by September 2014 as construction continued. The building is now named Central State Mansion and retains original features of the architecture as well as decorations suggestive of its history.

The site is the subject of the 2006 film Central State: Asylum for the Insane, a documentary produced and directed by independent filmmaker Dan T. Hall of Vizmo Films.

As of December 2022, only three of the original structures remain: the 1886 power plant, the 1895 pathology building, and a building of unidentified use.

See also
List of hospitals in Indianapolis

References

Further reading

External links
 Indiana Historical Society (photo of Seven Steeples)
 Historic Asylums Archive Photos
 Central State Documentary, History, Legends, and Building Map

Psychiatric hospitals in Indiana
Healthcare in Indianapolis
Hospitals established in 1896